89.1 Voice FM (89.1 FM) is a radio station owned and operated by Tagbilaran Broadcasting System. Its studio and transmitter are located at Brgy. Badiang, San Jose de Buenavista, Antique.

References

Radio stations established in 2013
Radio stations in Antique (province)